Box Hill is a small village in Wiltshire, England, most notable for its position above Brunel's famous Box Tunnel.

The village has a pub, the Quarrymans Arms.

External links

Box, Wiltshire
Villages in Wiltshire